Chawang is a district (amphoe) of Nakhon Si Thammarat province, southern Thailand.

Geography
Neighboring districts are (from the northeast clockwise): Phipun, Lan Saka, Chang Klang, Na Bon, Thung Yai, and Tham Phannara of Nakhon Si Thammarat; Wiang Sa of Surat Thani province.

The east of the district is part of the Khao Luang National Park.

Climate

Administration
The district is divided into 10 sub-districts (tambons), which are further subdivided into 84 villages (mubans). There are three subdistrict municipalities (thesaban tambons): Chan Di covers tambon Chan Di, and Chawang and Mai Riang each cover parts of the same-named tambons. There are a further 10 tambon administrative organizations (TAO).

Missing numbers are now part of Tham Phannara and Chang Klang Districts.

References

External links
amphoe.com

Districts of Nakhon Si Thammarat province